The (206) (styled "The [206]" on-screen) was a local sketch comedy television show in Seattle, Washington, broadcast by NBC affiliate KING-TV, that premiered on January 6, 2013. The show is broadcast on Sunday at 1:00 AM (Pacific), following Saturday Night Live. It was the successor to Almost Live! and much of the comedy is related to Seattle events and culture.

After two initial episodes, the show left the schedule locally; however, it returned for a full season  on April 27, 2013. The first season consists of 12 episodes, the last of which aired July 28, 2013. In addition, the "Not Especially Special, Special" was aired on July 7, 2013.

The second season began on November 16, 2013, and ended on May 3, 2014.

The third season began on October 18, 2014, but without John Keister; it was announced that he left the show to pursue other interests. He said he is now putting together a one-man show called The Keister Monologues. It ended in May 2015.

The show was replaced in September 2015 with Up Late Northwest (but branded on air as Up Late NW), which retained the basic sketch comedy/guest format and cast, but the show can now be seen in cities throughout the Pacific Northwest, not just Seattle.

References

External links
 
 
 
 KING-TV The (206) Website

Local comedy television series in the United States
Mass media in Seattle
Television shows filmed in Washington (state)
2010s American sketch comedy television series
2013 American television series debuts
American television spin-offs
2015 American television series endings